Brahmaji  (born 25 April 1965) is an Indian actor best known for his work in Telugu cinema. He is a regular actor in director Krishna Vamsi's films. Brahmaji appeared in an important role in Krishna Vamsi's debut film as a director, Gulabi.

He appeared in Krishna Vamsi's second film Ninne Pelladata. Krishna Vamsi made him hero with the movie Sindhooram. Later Brahmaji continued as a character artist. He appeared in lead roles in films such as Samakka Sarakka, Inspector, Kaki, Idea, Andariki Vandanalu, Adhyakshaa, Dhoom Dham, Abbo Vaada, Kumbakonam, and N.H-5. He received 'Santosham Allu Ramalingaiah Smarakam Award' at 16th Santosham Film Awards in 2018 for his comic roles in various Telugu films.

Early life 
 
During Brahmaji's college days, he was a big fan of superstar Krishna. Brahmaji's father used to work as a Tahsildar in Nellore, when J. V. Somayajulu a renowned stage actor, who was also a Deputy Collector, acted in the Telugu classic movie Sankarabharanam. For his performance in the movie, his co-workers from the Revenue department felicitated J. V. Somayajulu. Being Tahsildar's son, Brahmaji got a chance to see J. V. Somayajulu closely in the felicitation ceremony. All his father's co-workers have lined up on the stage to take blessings from J. V. Somayajulu.

Brahmaji claims he was spellbound at the respect J. V. Somayajulu received for acting in just one movie. At that point, Brahmaji decided that someday he would also act in movies and become a great actor like J. V. Somayajulu. This incident changed his life forever and after his Intermediate, Brahmaji went to Madras to fulfill his acting dreams. For over three decades now, he has been acting in movies.

Filmography

Telugu

Tamil

Kannada

References

External links

Male actors in Telugu cinema
Indian male film actors
Male actors from Andhra Pradesh
Living people
Telugu male actors
Telugu comedians
20th-century Indian male actors
21st-century Indian male actors
1965 births
People from East Godavari district
Indian male comedians
Indian comedians